This is a list of diplomatic missions in Yemen.  Due to the Yemeni Civil War, several countries have closed their embassies in Sana'a.

Embassies

Aden:

Sana'a

Embassies closed due to the war/ Vacant embassy

 [Ambassador withdrawn  and Closed embassy in 4 April 2015]

 [closed April 2015, temporarily relocated to Djibouti City]
 [Closed in 2008]
 [Closed and Vacant embassy]
 [closed April 2015, relocated to Djibouti City]
 [closed 11 February 2015]
 [closed 13 February 2015]
 [closed April 2015, temporarily relocated to Djibouti City]
 [closed 25 July 2019, relocated to Muscat]
 [Closed and Vacant embassy]
 [closed 13 February 2015]
 [closed 16 February 2015, temporarily relocated to Riyadh]
 [Closed and Vacant embassy]
 [Ambassador withdrawn and Vacant embassy]
 [Ambassador withdrawn and Vacant embassy]
 [Closed 2014]
 [Ambassador withdrawn and Vacant embassy]
 [closed 16 February 2015]
 [Closed 2015]
 [closed 23 August 2008]
 [closed 3 July 2003, relocated to Abu Dhabi]
 [closed December 2017, temporarily relocated to Riyadh]
 [Closed 13 July 2015]
 [closed 14 February 2015]

 [closed February 2015, Vacant embassy]
 [closed 14 February 2015]
 [closed 10 February 2015, temporarily relocated to Riyadh]

Accredited non-resident embassies to Yemen

Resident in Abu Dhabi, United Arab Emirates 

Resident in Addis Ababa, Ethiopia 

Resident in Cairo, Egypt 

Resident in Djibouti City, Djibouti 

Resident in Muscat, Oman

Resident in Riyadh, Saudi Arabia 

Resident in other cities

See also
Foreign relations of Yemen

Notes

References

Missions in Yemen

List
Yemen
Diplomatic missions